The Barat Daya Islands are a group of islands in the Maluku province of Indonesia. The Indonesian phrase barat daya means 'south-west'.

Geography
These islands are located off the eastern end of East Timor. Wetar is the largest island in the group. To the west, the Ombai Strait separates Wetar from Alor Island, part of East Nusa Tenggara. The Wetar Strait separates Wetar from Timor to the south.

Even though included in the Indonesian Maluku province political division, the southwestern islands are geographically part of the Lesser Sunda Islands. Rainfall is limited with a dry season between October and December when some of the islands appear as dry savannah. The Barat Daya Islands except Wetar are part of the Banda Sea Islands moist deciduous forests ecoregion. Wetar and Timor comprise the Timor and Wetar deciduous forests ecoregion. Most of the islands are barren, infertile and minimally forested.

Together with Timor, Nusa Tenggara, Sulawesi, and most of Maluku, the Barat Daya Islands are part of Wallacea, the group of Indonesian islands that are separated by deep water from both the Australian and Asian continental shelves. The islands of Wallacea have never been linked by land to either Asia or Australia, and as a result have few mammals and a mix of flora and fauna from both continents.

Islands 
Among the islands within the archipelago are (from west to east): 
 Liran
 Wetar
 Kisar
 Nyata
 Romang
 Leti Islands (Leti, Moa, Lakor)
 Sermata Islands
 Damer 
 Babar Islands

Populated places 

 Layoni (Teun Island)

Geology
The islands are part of the Inner Banda Arc, a volcanic island arc created by the collision of the Indo-Australian Plate and the Eurasian Plate. Romang and Damar are volcanic; Wetar consists mostly of oceanic crust that was pushed to the surface by the colliding plates. The Barat Daya and Banda islands constitute an inner arc; the outer arc, which includes Timor, the Tanimbar Islands, and the Kai Islands, is mostly made up of oceanic crust lifted up by the collision, and wraps around south and east of the inner arc.

History
Unlike much of the rest of the Maluku Islands, the Barat Daya Islands did not participate in the inter-island trade over the centuries. Damar was the region's only island to have produced spice. Too remote from the centre of the Malukan spice trade, the Dutch destroyed the nutmeg trees on Babar. Bugis and Makarassarese annually sailed to coral-rich Luang to purchase reef products such as trepang and mother of pearl.

Administration 
The Maluku Barat Daya Regency is administratively composed of seventeen districts (kecamatan), whose areas (in km2) and 2013 officially estimated populations are listed below.:

See also

Islands of Indonesia
Maluku Islands
Maluku (province)

References

 
Volcanoes of the Maluku Islands
Archipelagoes of Indonesia
Landforms of Maluku (province)

Inner Banda Arc
Islands of the Maluku Islands
Populated places in Indonesia